Mujan (also Romanized as Mūjan) is a village in Ashar Rural District, Ashar District, Mehrestan County, Sistan and Baluchestan Province, Iran. At the 2006 census, its population was 52, in 9 families.

References 

Populated places in Mehrestan County